Warrenton is an unincorporated community in Warren County, Mississippi. It is located approximately 5 miles south of Vicksburg on U.S. Route 61.

Warrenton is part of the Vicksburg Micropolitan Statistical Area.

History
The earliest settlement in this community was Hopewell Methodist Church and Cemetery, established in 1805.  It was the first church in Warren County, and still exists a short distance east of Warrenton.

Sometime after 1809, a brick courthouse was constructed at Warrenton, and the town became the first county seat.

A post office was established in 1811, and the town incorporated in 1820.

At the time, Warrenton was the largest, most centrally located, and most important place in the county.

Nearby Vicksburg began to prosper due to its better landing, higher location, and more vigorous leadership.  The county seat was moved there in 1825.

During the 1830s, Warrenton continued as a place of cotton export.

Due to the town's low-lying swampy location, it suffered from river floods and epidemics such as yellow fever, smallpox and cholera.

During the Civil War, Confederate forces established a fortification at Warrenton.  The town was badly damaged by shelling during the war.

Warrenton was a stop on the Vicksburg, Pensacola and Ship Island Railroad, constructed in the 1870s.

After 1883, the river moved westward, leaving a sandbank between the town and its port.  The town quickly declined.  In 1903, the post office was removed.

Today, the community is a mix of agriculture and residential properties.  Nothing remains of the original settlement but the Hopewell Church and Cemetery.  The Vicksburg Airport is located at the south end of Warrenton.

References

External links
Map from 1842 showing the location of Warrenton in Mississippi

Unincorporated communities in Mississippi
Unincorporated communities in Warren County, Mississippi